Michael "Mike" Campbell (born May 21, 1975) is a retired American professional basketball player.

High school and college career 
Campbell was born in Brooklyn, New York and played at Manhattan Park West High School in New York City. He went on to play at the Westchester Community College. In 1995, he was transferred to LIU Brooklyn. He was named two-time Battle of Brooklyn MVP, 1997 and 1998. In December 2017, Campbell was honored as a member of the LIU Brooklyn Athletics Hall of Fame.

Professional career 
A swingman, Campbell played in Argentina, Belgium, Cyprus, France, Israel, Italy, Portugal, Venezuela, and Yugoslavia, beside domestic leagues such as CBA, USBL, and BSN (Puerto Rico).  

Campbell played for YUBA League teams Hemofarm and Crvena zvezda between 2002 and 2003. In 2006, he played for two BSN teams, Atléticos de San Germán and Maratonistas de Coamo. In the 2007–08 season, he played for Israeli team Hapoel Galil Elyon. In 2009, he played for Argentinian team Unión de Sunchales. Campbell retired as a player with Belgian team Optima Gent in 2010.

References

External links
 Michael Campbell at proballers.com
 Mike Campbell at realgm.com
 Mike Campbell at eurobasket.com

1975 births
Living people
ABA League players
American expatriate basketball people in Argentina
American expatriate basketball people in Belgium
American expatriate basketball people in Cyprus
American expatriate basketball people in France
American expatriate basketball people in Israel
American expatriate basketball people in Italy
American expatriate basketball people in Portugal
American expatriate basketball people in Serbia
American expatriate basketball people in Venezuela
American men's basketball players
Atléticos de San Germán players
Baloncesto Superior Nacional players
Brussels Basketball players
Basketball players from New York City
Bucaneros de La Guaira players
Fort Wayne Fury players
Gaiteros del Zulia players
Gent Hawks players
Hapoel Galil Elyon players
KK Crvena zvezda players
KK Hemofarm players
LIU Brooklyn Blackbirds men's basketball players
Maratonistas de Coamo players
Panteras de Miranda players
Scafati Basket players
Shooting guards
Small forwards
Sportspeople from Brooklyn
Unión de Sunchales basketball players
United States Basketball League players